Antónis (Greek alphabet: Αντώνης) is a Greek masculine given name that is a variant of Antonios that is used in Greece and Cyprus. Antonis is a Dutch masculine given name that is a diminutive of Anthonius that is used in Netherlands, Belgium, South Africa, Namibia, Indonesia and Suriname. It is sometimes a surname and is transliterated as Antonios and Andonis. Antonis is a cognate of the English language name Anthony. People bearing the name Antonis or Antónis include:

Given name
Antonis Antoniadis (born 1946), Greek footballer
Antonis Antoniadis (born 1946), Greek naval officer
Antonis Aresti (born 1983), Cypriot track and field paralympian athlete 
Antonis Benakis (1873–1954), Greek art collector and museum founder
Antonis Bourselis (born 1994), Greek footballer
Antonis Constantinides (born 1974), Cypriot basketball coach 
Antonis Christeas (1937–2011), Greek basketball player
Antonis Daglis (1974–1997), Greek serial killer
Antonis Dedakis (born 1995), Greek footballer
Antonis Diamantidis (1892–1945), Greek rebetiko musician
Antonis Drossoyannis (1922–2006), Greek Army general and politician 
Antonis Fostieris (born 1953), Greek poet
Antonis Fotiadis (1899–19??), Greek footballer
Antonis Fotsis (born 1981), Greek basketball player
Antonis Georgallides (born 1982), Cypriot footballer
Antonis Georgiades, Cypriot politician 
Antonis Georgiadis (born 1933), Greek footballer
Antonis Iliadis (born 1993), Greek footballer
Antonis Kablionis (born 1991), Greek footballer
Antonis Kafetzopoulos (born 1951), Greek actor
Antonis Kanakis (born 1969), Greek television host and an actor
Antonis Kapnidis (born 1992), Greek footballer
Antonis Katsantonis (c. 1775–1808), Greek klepht
Antonis Katsis (born 1989), Cypriot footballer
Antonis Koniaris (born 1997), Greek basketball player
Antonis Kotsakas (born 1947), Greek politician 
Antonis Ladakis (born 1982), Greek footballer
Antonis Makris (born 1981), Cypriot footballer
Antonis Manikas (born 1959), Greek footballer and manager 
Antonis Manitakis (born 1944), Greek politician and educator 
Antonis Mantzaris (born 1986), Greek basketball player
Antonis Martasidis (born 1992), Greek-Cypriot weightlifter
Antonis Michaloglou (born 1988), Greek basketball player
Antonis Migiakis (1911–1999), Greek footballer 
Antonis Minou (born 1958), Greek footballer
Antonis Natsouras (born 1979), Greek footballer
Antonis Nikolaidis (born 1967), British-Cypriot sport shooter
Antonis Oikonomou (1785–1821), Greek naval captain
Antonis Panagi (born 1983), Cypriot footballer
Antonis Papadakis (1893–1980), Greek Cretan lyra musician 
Antonis Papasavvas (born 1995), Greek footballer
Antonis Paschalides (born 1952), Greek-Cypriot politician and lawyer
Antonis Petropoulos (born 1986), Greek footballer
Antonis Prekas (born 1960), Greek journalist, actor, television report and author
Antonis Ranos (born 1993), Greek footballer
Antonis Remos (born 1970), Greek singer
Antonis Rikka (born 1986), French-Greek footballer
Antonis Roupakiotis, Greek lawyer and politician
Antonis Samarakis (1919–2003), Greek writer
Antonis Samaras (born 1951), Greek politician. former Prime Minister of Greece
Antonis Siatounis (born 2002), Greek footballer
Antonis Tritsis (1937–1992), Greek politician 
Antonis Tsiaras (born 1993), Greek footballer
Antonis Tsotras (born 1990), Greek sport sailor
Antonis Vardis (1948–2014), Greek composer and singer
Antonis Vasiliou (born 1996), Cypriot footballer
Antonis Volanis (born 1948), Greek automobile and industrial designer
Antonis Vratsanos (1919–2008), Greek communist saboteur
Antonis Xylouris (born 1942), Greek composer, singer, Cretan lyra performer

Surname
Carlos De Antonis, Argentine opera singer
Terry Antonis (born 1993), Australian footballer

See also

Andonis
Antonic
Anthonis
Antonijs
Antonios
Antonik
Antoniu

References

Dutch masculine given names
Greek masculine given names